Hirota may refer to:

Hirota (surname)
Hirota, Ehime, a former village located in Iyo District, Ehime, Japan
Hirota Station, a train station in Aizuwakamatsu, Fukushima Prefecture, Japan
Hirota Shrine